Asafua Festival is an annual festival celebrated by the chiefs and people of Sekondi in the Western Region of Ghana. It is usually celebrated in the month of June.

Celebrations 
During the festival, visitors are welcomed to share food and drinks. The people put on traditional clothes and there is durbar of chiefs. There is also dancing and drumming.

Significance 
This festival is celebrated to purify the divinity of Asafua.

References 

Festivals in Ghana
Western Region (Ghana)